John Farrell MacDonald (June 6, 1875 – August 2, 1952) was an American character actor and director. He played supporting roles and occasional leads. He appeared in over 325 films over a four-decade career from 1911 to 1951, and directed forty-four silent films from 1912 to 1917.

MacDonald was the principal director of L. Frank Baum's Oz Film Manufacturing Company, and he can frequently be seen in the films of Frank Capra, Preston Sturges and, especially, John Ford.

Early years
MacDonald was born in Waterbury, Connecticut. George A. Katchme's A Biographical Dictionary of Silent Film Western Actors and Actresses gives his date of birth as April 14, 1875. He was sometimes billed as Joseph Farrell MacDonald, J.F. Mcdonald and Joseph Farrell Macdonald as well as other variations.

MacDonald graduated from Yale University with a B.A. degree in 1903 and played football while he was there.

Career

Early in his career, MacDonald was a singer in minstrel shows, and he toured the United States extensively for two years with stage productions.  He made his first silent film in 1911, a dramatic short entitled The Scarlett Letter made by Carl Laemmle's Independent Moving Pictures Company (IMP), the forerunner of Universal Pictures,. He continued to act in numerous films each year from that time on, and by 1912 he was directing them as well.  The first film he directed was The Worth of a Man, another dramatic short, again for IMP, and he was to direct 43 more films until his last in 1917, Over the Fence, which he co-directed with Harold Lloyd.  MacDonald had crossed paths with Lloyd several years earlier, when Lloyd was an extra and MacDonald had given him much-needed work – and he did the same with Hal Roach, both of whom appearing in small roles in The Patchwork Girl of Oz, which MacDonald directed in 1914.  When Roach set up his own studio, with Lloyd as his principal attraction, he hired MacDonald to direct.

By 1918, MacDonald, who was to become one of the most beloved character men in Hollywood, had given up directing and was acting full-time, predominantly in Westerns and Irish comedies.  He first worked under director John Ford in 1919's A Fight for Love and was to make three more with the director that same year.  In all, Ford would use MacDonald on twenty-five films between 1919 and 1950, during the silent era notably in The Iron Horse (1924), 3 Bad Men (1926) and Riley the Cop (1927).

With a voice that matched his personality, MacDonald made the transition to sound films easily, with no noticeable drop in his acting output – if anything, it went up. In 1931, for instance, MacDonald appeared in 14 films – among them the first version of The Maltese Falcon, in which he played "Detective Tom Polhaus" – and in 22 of them in 1932.  Although he played laborers, policemen, military men and priests, among many other characters, his roles were usually a cut above a "bit part". His characters usually had names, and he was most often credited for his performances.  A highlight of this period was his performance as the hobo "Mr. Tramp" in Our Little Girl with Shirley Temple (1935); another one is his large comedic role in Raoul Walsh's Me and My Gal (1932) with Spencer Tracy and Joan Bennett.

In the 1940s, MacDonald was part of Preston Sturges' unofficial "stock company" of character actors, appearing in seven films written and directed by Sturges.  MacDonald appeared in Sullivan's Travels, The Palm Beach Story, The Miracle of Morgan's Creek, The Great Moment, The Sin of Harold Diddlebock, Unfaithfully Yours and The Beautiful Blonde from Bashful Bend, Sturges' last American film.  Earlier, MacDonald had also appeared in The Power and the Glory starring Spencer Tracy, which Sturges wrote.  His work on Sturges' films was generally uncredited, which was more often the case as his career went on – although the quality of his work was undiminished.  He was notable in 1946 in John Ford's My Darling Clementine in which he played "Mac," the bartender in the town saloon. MacDonald also had uncredited roles in It's a Wonderful Life and Here Comes the Groom.

MacDonald made his last film in 1951, a comedy called Elopement. His few television appearances also occurred in that same year.

Death
MacDonald died in Hollywood on August 2, 1952, at the age of 77. He was married to actress Edith Bostwick until her death in 1943, and they had a daughter, Lorna. His grave is located at Chapel of the Pines Crematory.

Filmography

Silent

 The Scarlet Letter (1911, Short) – Minor Role (film debut)
 The Worth of a Man (1912, director)
 Rory o' the Bogs (1913, director)
 Samson (1914, director)
 The Patchwork Girl of Oz (1914, director)
 The Magic Cloak of Oz (1914, director)
 His Majesty, the Scarecrow of Oz (1914, director)
 The Last Egyptian (1914, director) – Kara, the Last Egyptian
 The Heart of Maryland (1915) – Col. Thorpe
 Rags (1915) – Paul Ferguson
 Lonesome Luke, Social Gangster (1915, director)
 Over the Fence (1917, director)
 The Best Man (1917) – Minor Role (uncredited)
 $5,000 Reward (1918) – Norcross
 Fair Enough (1918) – Chief of Police Morgan
 Roped (1919) – Butler
 Molly of the Follies (1919) – Swannick
 A Fight for Love (1919) – The Priest
 A Charge to Keep (1919) – Officer Hennessey
 Riders of Vengeance (1919) – Buell
 Trixie from Broadway (1919) – Slim Hayes
 A Sporting Chance (1919) – Luther Ripley aka Kennedy
 The Outcasts of Poker Flat (1919)
 This Hero Stuff (1919) – Softnose Smith
 Marked Men (1919) – Tom Placer McGraw
 Bullet Proof (1920) – Jim Boone
 The Path She Chose (1920) – Father
 Hitchin' Posts (1920) – Joe Alabam
 The Freeze-Out (1921) – Bobtail McGuire
Desperate Youth (1921) – 'Mendocino' Bill
 The Wallop (1921) – Neuces River
 Little Miss Hawkshaw (1921) – Inspector Hahn
 Action (1921) – Mormon Peters
 Bucking the Line (1921) – Dave Kinsey
 Riding with Death (1921) – Sheriff Pat Garrity
 Trailin' (1921) – Joseph Piotto
 Sky High (1922) – Jim Frazer
 Come on Over (1922) – Michael Morahan
 The Bachelor Daddy (1922) – Joe Pelton
 Tracks (1922) – Jack Bess
 Over the Border (1922) – Peter Galbraith
 The Bonded Woman (1922) – Captain Gaskell
 The Ghost Breaker (1922) – Sam Marcum
 Manslaughter (1922) – (uncredited)
 The Young Rajah (1922) – Amhad Beg – Prime Minister
 While Paris Sleeps (1923) – George Morier
 Quicksands (1923) – Col. Patterson
 Racing Hearts (1923) – Silas Martin
 Drifting (1923) – Murphy
 The Age of Desire (1923) – Dan Reagan
 Fashionable Fakers (1923) – Pat O'Donnell
 Fair Week (1924) – Jasper Remus
 The Storm Daughter (1924) – Con Mullaney
 Mademoiselle Midnight (1924) – Duc de Moing (Prologue)
 Western Luck (1924) – 'Chuck' Campbell
 The Signal Tower (1924) – Pete
 The Iron Horse (1924) – Cpl. Casey
 Gerald Cranston's Lady (1924) – Rennie
 Those Who Dare (1924)
 The Brass Bowl (1924) – Hickey
 Let Women Alone (1925) – Commodore John Gordon
 The Scarlet Honeymoon (1925) – Joshua Thorpe
 Lightnin' (1925) – Lemuel Townsend
 The Lucky Horseshoe (1925) – Mack
 Kentucky Pride (1925) – Donovan
 Thank You (1925) – Andy
 The Fighting Heart (1925) – Jerry
 The First Year (1926) – Mr. Barstow
 The Dixie Merchant (1926) – Jean Paul Fippany
 The Shamrock Handicap (1926) – Con O'Shea
 A Trip to Chinatown (1926) – Benjamin Strong
 The Last Frontier (1926) – Wild Bill Hickok
 3 Bad Men (1926) – Mike Costigan
 The Family Upstairs (1926) – Joe Heller
 The Country Beyond (1926) – Sgt. Cassidy
 Bertha, the Sewing Machine Girl (1926) – Sloan
 The Scarlet Honeymoon (1926)
 Ankles Preferred (1927) – McGuire
 Love Makes 'Em Wild (1927) – W. Barden
 Rich But Honest (1927) – Diamond Jim O'Grady
 Cradle Snatchers (1927) – George Martin
 Colleen (1927) – Mr. O'Flynn
 Paid to Love (1927) – Peter Roberts
 Sunrise: A Song of Two Humans (1927) – The Photographer
 East Side, West Side (1927) – Pug Malone
 The Cohens and the Kellys in Paris (1928) – Patrick Kelly
 Bringing Up Father (1928) – Jiggs
 None but the Brave (1928) – John Craig
 4 Devils (1928) – The Clown
 Riley the Cop (1928) – James 'Aloysius' Riley
 Strong Boy (1929) – Angus McGregor
 Masked Emotions (1929) – Will Whitten

Sound

 Abie's Irish Rose (1928) – Patrick Murphy
 In Old Arizona (1928) – Stage Passenger (uncredited)
 Masquerade (1929) – Joe Hickey
 Happy Days (1929) – Train Conductor
 The Painted Angel (1929) – Pa Hudler
 South Sea Rose (1929) – Hackett
 Men Without Women (1930) – Costello
 Song o' My Heart (1930) – Rafferty
 The Girl of the Golden West (1930) – Sonora Slim
 Born Reckless (1930) – Pat O'Toole
 The Truth About Youth (1930) – Colonel Graham
 Other Men's Women (1931) – Peg-Leg
 The Painted Desert (1931) – Jeff Cameron
 The Easiest Way (1931) – Ben
 Woman Hungry (1931) – Buzzard
 The Millionaire (1931) – Dan Lewis
 Too Young to Marry (1931) – Rev. Stump
 The Maltese Falcon (1931) – Det. Sgt. Tom Polhouse
 Sporting Blood (1931) – MacGuire
 The Brat (1931) – Timothy Timson – the Butler
 The Squaw Man (1931) – Big Bill
 The Spirit of Notre Dame (1931) – Coach
 Touchdown (1931) – Pop Stewart
 Under Eighteen (1931) – Pop Evans
 Discarded Lovers (1932) – Chief Sommers
 Hotel Continental (1932) – Detective Martin
 Steady Company (1932) – Hogan
 Probation (1932) – Uncle George
 Scandal for Sale (1932) – Treadway
 The Strange Love of Molly Louvain (1932) – Police Sgt. J.B. Antrim (uncredited)
 Week-End Marriage (1932) – Mr. Davis
 Stranger in Town (1932) – Scout (uncredited)
 Madame Racketeer (1932) – John Adams
 The Vanishing Frontier (1932) – Waco
 The Hurricane Express (1932) – Jim Baker
 The Thirteenth Guest (1932) – Police Capt. Ryan
 The Phantom Express (1932) – D.J. 'Smokey' Nolan
 Hearts of Humanity (1932) – Tom O'Hara
 70,000 Witnesses (1932) – State Coach
 This Sporting Age (1932) – Jerry O'Day
 Heritage of the Desert (1932) – Adam Naab
 The Pride of the Legion (1932) – Police Chief Scott
 Men Are Such Fools (1932) – Prison Warden Randolph
 Me and My Gal (1932) – Pop Riley
 No Man of Her Own (1932) – 'Dickie' Collins
 The Racing Strain (1932) – Mr. Martin
 The Iron Master (1933) – J.C. Stillman
 The Working Man (1933) – Henry Davis
 Peg o' My Heart (1933) – Patrick Shamus 'Pat' O'Connell
 Laughing at Life (1933) – Prison Warden
 The Power and the Glory (1933) – Mulligan
 I Loved a Woman (1933) – Shuster
 Murder on the Campus (1933) – Police Capt. Ed Kyne
 Myrt and Marge (1933) – Grady
 Under Secret Orders (1933) – John Burke
 Man of Two Worlds (1934) – Michael
 The Crosby Case (1934) – The Doorman—Mike Costello
 The Crime Doctor (1934) – Kemp
 Once to Every Woman (1934) – Flannigan
 She Made Her Bed (1934) – Bookmaker (uncredited)
 The Cat's-Paw (1934) – Shigley
 Beggar's Holiday (1934) – Pop Malloy
 The Best Man Wins (1935) – Captain—Harbor Patrol
 Romance in Manhattan (1935) – Officer Murphy
 Maybe It's Love (1935) – The Cop
 Square Shooter (1935) – Sheriff
 Northern Frontier (1935) – Inspector McKenzie
 The Whole Town's Talking (1935) – Prison Warden (uncredited)
 Star of Midnight (1935) – Police Inspector Doremus
 Swellhead (1935) – Umpire
 Let 'Em Have It (1935) – Mr. Keefer
 Our Little Girl (1935) – Mr. Tramp
 The Healer (1935) – Applejack
 The Arizonian (1935) – Marshal Andy Jordan
 Shadows of the Orient (1935) – Inspector Sullivan
 Front Page Woman (1935) – Hallohan
 Danger Ahead (1935) – Harry Cromwell – City Editor
 The Irish in Us (1935) – Capt. Jackson
 The Farmer Takes a Wife (1935) – (uncredited)
 Waterfront Lady (1935) – Capt. O'Brien
 Stormy (1935) – Trinidad Dorn
 Fighting Youth (1935) – Coach Parker
 Hitch Hike Lady (1935) – Judge Hale
 Riffraff (1936) – 'Brains' McCall
 Exclusive Story (1936) – Michael Devlin
 Florida Special (1936) – Captain Timothy Harrigan
 Show Boat (1936) – Windy McClain
 Mysterious Crossing (1936) – Police Chief Bullock
 Maid of Salem (1937) – Captain of Ship
 The Great Barrier (1937) – Major Rogers
 The Hit Parade (1937) – Sgt. O'Hara
 Parnell (1937) – Irish Laborer (uncredited)
 Slave Ship (1937) – Proprietor
 Slim (1937, Warner Bros) – Pop
 Flying Fists (1937) – Bill 'One-Punch' Fagin
 Roaring Timber (1937) – Andrew MacKinley
 Topper (1937) – Policeman
 My Dear Miss Aldrich (1937) – 'Doc' Howe
 The Game That Kills (1937) – Joe Holland
 County Fair (1937) – 	Calvin Williams – Julie's Father
 Courage of the West (1937) – Buck Saunders
 My Old Kentucky Home (1938) – Mayor Jim Hopkins
 White Banners (1938) – Dr. Thompson
 State Police (1938) – Charlie Wheeler
 Extortion (1938) – Coach Pearson
 Numbered Woman (1938)
 Barefoot Boy (1938) – Warden
 The Crowd Roars (1938) – Father Ryan
 The Last Express (1938) – William Barton
 There Goes My Heart (1938) – Officer
 Submarine Patrol (1938) – CWO 'Sails' Quincannon
 Gang Bullets (1938) – Chief Reardon
 Come On, Rangers (1938) – Colonel Forbes
 Little Orphan Annie (1938) – 'Pop' Corrigan
 The Lone Ranger Rides Again (1939, Serial) – Craig Dolan
 East Side of Heaven (1939) – Doorman (uncredited)
 Zenobia (1939) – Judge
 Susannah of the Mounties (1939) – Pat O'Hannegan
 Mickey the Kid (1939) – Sheriff J.J. Willoughby
 They Shall Have Music (1939) – Police Chief (uncredited)
 Conspiracy (1939) – Captain of the Falcon
 Coast Guard (1939) – Capt. Hansen (uncredited)
 Full Confession (1939) – Joe, Police Sergeant (uncredited)
 The Housekeeper's Daughter (1939) – Police Captain (uncredited)
 The Gentleman from Arizona (1939) – Wild Bill Coburn
 Knights of the Range (1940) – Cappy
 Dark Command (1940) – Dave
 The Light of Western Stars (1940) – Bill Stillwell
 I Take This Oath (1940) – Insp. Tim Ryan
 Prairie Law (1940) – Sheriff Jim Austin
 The Last Alarm (1940) – Jim Hadley
 Untamed (1940) – Doctor Billar
 Stagecoach War (1940) – Jeff Chapman
 Friendly Neighbors (1940) – Sheiff Potts
 Meet John Doe (1941) – 'Sourpuss'
 In Old Cheyenne (1941) – Tim Casey
 The Great Lie (1941) – Dr. Ferguson
 Broadway Limited (1941) – RR Line Supt. Mulcahey (uncredited)
 Riders of the Timberline (1941) – Jim Kerrigan
 Sullivan's Travels (1941) – Desk Sergeant (uncredited)
 Law of the Timber (1941) – Adams
 Private Snuffy Smith (1942) – General Rosewater
 Wild Bill Hickok Rides (1942) – Judge Henry Hathaway
 Captains of the Clouds (1942) – Dr. Neville
 Reap the Wild Wind (1942) – Port Captain
 One Thrilling Night (1942) – Police Sgt. Haggerty
 Little Tokyo, U.S.A. (1942) – Capt. Wade
 The Palm Beach Story (1942) – Officer O'Donnell (uncredited)
 Phantom Killer (1942) – Police Captain
 Bowery at Midnight (1942) – Capt. Mitchell
 The Living Ghost (1942) – Police Lt. 'Pete' Peterson
 The McGuerins from Brooklyn (1942) – Cop
 The Ape Man (1943) – Police CaptainO'Brien
 Harrigan's Kid (1943) – Frank (uncredited)
 Clancy Street Boys (1943) – Police Sgt. Flanagan
 Tiger Fangs (1943) – Geoffrey MacCardle
 The Miracle of Morgan's Creek (1943) – Sheriff (uncredited)
 True to Life (1943) – Bit Role (uncredited)
 Texas Masquerade (1944) – John Martindale
 Pin Up Girl (1944) – Train Conductor (uncredited)
 Ladies of Washington (1944) – Night Watchman (uncredited)
 Follow the Leader (1944) – Clancy, Policeman
 The Great Moment (1944) – The Priest
 Shadow of Suspicion (1944) – Police Captain Mike Dolan
 Greenwich Village (1944) – Police Officer O'Shea (uncredited)
 Irish Eyes Are Smiling (1944) – Stage Doorman (uncredited)
 Hangover Square (1945) – Street Vendor (uncredited)
 A Tree Grows in Brooklyn (1945) – Carney The Junkman (uncredited)
 Circumstantial Evidence (1945) – Jury Foreman (uncredited)
 Nob Hill (1945) – Cabby with Katie (uncredited)
 The Dolly Sisters (1945) – Opera Stage Doorman (uncredited)
 Johnny Angel (1945) – Capt. Angel
 Fallen Angel (1945) – Bank Guard (uncredited)
 The Woman Who Came Back (1945) – Sheriff
 Pillow of Death (1945) – The Graveyard Sexton (uncredited)
 Pardon My Past (1945) – Policeman (uncredited)
 Behind Green Lights (1946) – O'Malley – Morgue Attendant (uncredited)
 Joe Palooka, Champ (1946) – Long-Count Bowman
 Smoky (1946) – Jim – the Cook
 My Darling Clementine (1946) – Mac the Barman
 It's a Wonderful Life (1946) – Man Whose Grandfather Planted Tree (uncredited)
 The Sin of Harold Diddlebock (1947) – Desk Sergeant (uncredited)
 Web of Danger (1947) – Scotty MacKronish – Bus Driver
 Thunder in the Valley (1947) – McPherson, Innkeeper (uncredited)
 Keeper of the Bees (1947) – Postmaster
 The Bachelor and the Bobby-Soxer (1947) – Mac – Bailiff (uncredited)
 Christmas Eve (1947) – Policeman (uncredited)
 If You Knew Susie (1948) – Police Sergeant (uncredited)
 Panhandle (1948) – Doc Cooper
 Sitting Pretty (1948) – Cop (uncredited)
 Fury at Furnace Creek (1948) – Pops Murphy (uncredited)
 The Walls of Jericho (1948) – Bailiff (uncredited)
 Unfaithfully Yours (1948) – Stage Doorman (uncredited)
 When My Baby Smiles at Me (1948) – Doorman (uncredited)
 Belle Starr's Daughter (1948) – Doc Benson
 Shep Comes Home (1948) – Sheriff Cap Weatherby
 Whispering Smith (1948) – Bill Baggs
 Trouble Preferred (1948) – Apartment House Manager (uncredited)
 Law of the Barbary Coast (1949) – Sergeant O'Leary
 Streets of San Francisco (1949) – Pop Lockhart
 The Beautiful Blonde from Bashful Bend (1949) – Sheriff Sweetser
 You're My Everything (1949) – Doorman (uncredited)
 Sand (1949) – Telegraph Operator (uncredited)
 Fighting Man of the Plains (1949) – Partridge
 The Dalton Gang (1949) – Judge Price
 When Willie Comes Marching Home (1950) – Gilby – Pharmacist (uncredited)
 Dakota Lil (1950) – Ellis
 The Daltons' Women (1950) – Alvin – Stage Company Representative
 Mother Didn't Tell Me (1950) – Train Conductor (uncredited)
 Hostile Country (1950) – Mr. Lane (uncredited)
 Woman on the Run (1950) – Sea Captain
 Mr. Belvedere Rings the Bell (1951) – Mr. Kroeger (uncredited)
 Here Comes the Groom (1951) – Husband on Airplane (uncredited)
 Golden Girl (1951) – Husband (uncredited)
 Superman and the Mole Men (1951) – Pop Shannon
 Elopement (1951) – Mr. Simpson (uncredited) (final film role)

References

External links

1875 births
1952 deaths
American male film actors
American male silent film actors
American male television actors
20th-century American male actors
Burials at Chapel of the Pines Crematory
Male actors from Connecticut
Actors from Waterbury, Connecticut
Yale University alumni
Film directors from Connecticut